Barendrecht railway station is a railway station in Barendrecht, Netherlands, located on the Breda–Rotterdam railway between Rotterdam and Dordrecht. Adjacent to the four tracks of this line are two tracks for the HSL-Zuid and three for freight, as part of the Betuweroute freight route to Zevenaar. On top is a new city park. At the station itself its four tracks, with the platforms, have a glass roof.

The station was opened on 1 November 1872. This building was replaced by a smaller and more modern building in 1973. A new railway station was opened in 2001.  Queen Beatrix visited the station on 16 June 2007, to open the Betuweroute freight route.

Train services
The following services call at Barendrecht:
6x per hour local services (sprinter) The Hague - Rotterdam - Dordrecht

Bus services
 84 (Station Barendrecht - Rotterdam Zuidplein) - QBuzz, 4x per hour, 2x per hour on Sundays
 188 (Station Barendrecht - Industrial Area Barendrecht) - Monday to Friday from roof of the station
 187 (Barendrecht Handelsweg - Station Barendrecht - Rotterdam Zuidplein) - Rush hour only. 2x per hour towards Barendrecht in the morning, 2x per hour towards Rotterdam in the afternoon.
 601 (Rotterdam Beverwaard - Station Barendrecht - Barendrecht Gemeentehuis) - Does not run in the evening and on Sundays.
 717 (Station Barendrecht - Heerjansdam - Zwijndrecht) - Arriva, 1x per hour, at Sundays on request

External links
NS website 
Dutch Public Transport journey planner 
RET Bus 

Railway stations in South Holland
Railway stations opened in 1872
Railway stations on the Staatslijn I
Barendrecht